Craig Van Ymeren (born March 10, 1989 in Aylmer, Ontario) is a Canadian curler. He currently plays second on Team Travis Fanset.

Career
Van Ymeren played third for the Jake Walker rink that won the 2010 Canadian Junior Curling Championships
in 2010.  The team represented Canada at the 2010 World Junior Curling Championships in Flims, Switzerland where they won a bronze medal.

References

External links
 

Living people
People from Elgin County
1989 births
Curlers from Ontario
Canadian male curlers